Alexander Sarkissian (born April 3, 1990) is an American professional tennis player of Armenian descent. He won his first ATP Challenger title at the 2015 Gimcheon Open ATP Challenger in South Korea in June 2015.

ATP Challenger Tour finals

Singles: 1 (1–0)

References

External links

American male tennis players
1990 births
Living people
Sportspeople from Glendale, California
Pepperdine Waves men's tennis players
Armenian American
American people of Armenian descent
Tennis people from California
Armenian-American tennis players